Paul Hanley and Jim Thomas were the defending champions, but Hanley did not participate this year.  Thomas partnered Yves Allegro, losing in the quarterfinals.

Simon Aspelin and Julian Knowle won the title, defeating Leoš Friedl and David Škoch 7–6(8–6), 5–7, [10–5] in the final.

Seeds

Draw

Draw

External links
Draw

Doubles
2007 ATP Tour